Lamba is a language found in Zambia and is commonly spoken in the Copperbelt. There are about 210,000 native speakers in the northern parts of Zambia and southern fringes of the Democratic Republic of the Congo. Lamba is also spoken in Lusaka, mainly because many speakers have migrated there for jobs. Lamba is a Bantu language. (In fact, "mu ntu" means "one person" in Lamba and "ba ntu" means "two or more people".) Depending on who does the counting, Zambia has between 42 and 78 local languages besides English – see Languages of Zambia for further details. 

Maho (2009) lists the Lima (Bulima) and Temba varieties as distinct languages.

References

Languages of Zambia
Languages of the Democratic Republic of the Congo
Sabi languages